Bayou I Township is an inactive township in Ozark County, in the U.S. state of Missouri.

Bayou I Township takes its name from Bayou Creek within its borders.

Communities

The village of Bakersfield and the unincorporated community of Udall are located within the township.

References

Townships in Missouri
Townships in Ozark County, Missouri